Leja is a surname. Notable people with this surname include:

Franciszek Leja (1885–1975), Polish mathematician
Frank Leja (1936–1991), U.S. baseball player
Walter Leja (1921–1992), Polish-born Canadian bomb disposal expert and soldier

See also
Lajat (alternatively spelled Leja), largest lava field in Syria

surnames